Ángel Rambert (12 June 1936 – 25 October 1983) was an Argentine-born French footballer. He played as a striker for Lanús, Lyon and Avignon Foot 84, as well as the French national side.

Ángel's son Sebastián also played professional football, representing the Argentina national team.

References

External links
 Player profile at FFF 
 
 

1936 births
1983 deaths
Footballers from Buenos Aires
Argentine people of French descent
Argentine footballers
French footballers
France international footballers
Club Atlético Lanús footballers
Olympique Lyonnais players
Ligue 1 players
Argentine Primera División players
Association football forwards
AC Avignonnais players